Ahmad Akbarpour Ahmad Akbarpūr , born July 31, 1970 in Chah Varz, Lamerd, Fars Province, is a novelist and author of short stories and children's books.

Biography
Ahmad Akbarpour was born on 31 July 1970 in Chah Varz. He got his BA in psychology from Shahid Beheshti University in Tehran.

Ahmad Akbarpour has started his literary career at the age of 24 by composing poetry. He published his first and only collection of poetry, People of the Thursday Evening, in 1993. 

A student of Reza Barahani and Houshang Golshiri, he soon started writing fiction for adolescents, adopting a postmodern style of writing.

Books
That Night’s Train, published in 1999, received the Book of the Year award from Iran's Ministry of Culture. The novel narrates the story of a little girl who recently lost her mother and meets with a teacher during a train trip. This short novel was adapted as a TV film by Hamid Reza Hafezi and later as a movie by Hamid Reza Ghotbi. 

Published in 2002, Good Night Commander was financially supported jointly by UNICEF and Iran's Children’s Book Council. This children's anti-war book tells the story of a maimed child who meets with an enemy toy soldier in his dreams.

Themes
During his career, Akbarpour discussed such topics as fear, loneliness, and peace. In some of his works as If I Were a Pilot, Good Night Commander, and Emperor of Words he shows his disdain for the destructive impact of war on children.

Translations
Good Night Commander and That Night’s Train (illustrated by Isabelle Arsenault) have been published in English by Groundwood Books in the United States and Canada in 2010 and 2012 respectively.

Bibliography

Poetry

Youth books

Short Story

Awards
 Honor list of IBBY 2006: The Emperor of Words

References 

Iranian male novelists
Iranian novelists
Iranian male short story writers
Iranian children's writers
People from Fars Province
1970 births
Living people